Milo "Gene" Harmon (January 27, 1952 – December 11, 2015) was a former American college basketball player.

At , Harmon played small forward for Coach Eddie Sutton at Creighton University in Omaha, Nebraska from 1971 to 1974. He was the leading scorer and Team MVP all 3 years he played on the varsity team, and was a member of Eddie Sutton's first NCAA tournament team in 1974. He left the school as the 4th leading scorer in Creighton University history with a total of 1,369 points and is currently the 15th leading scorer of all-time. By NCAA rule, freshmen were not allowed to compete at the varsity level, so his stats totals only include his sophomore through senior seasons.

Harmon ended his college career by scoring 22 points against the University of Louisville to secure a 3rd-place finish in the Midwest Regional of the NCAA tournament in 1974 at the Mabee Center in Tulsa, Oklahoma. In a combined total of three NCAA tournament games in 1974, Creighton went 2–1 with victories over the University of Texas (77–61) and University of Louisville (80–71), but lost to the University of Kansas (55–54) in the round of 16. Harmon averaged 20 points during the tournament and did not miss a single free throw (10–10). He was named to the 1974 Midwest All-Regional Team.

Harmon was an AP Honorable Mention All-American and was selected to play in the 1974 National Association of Basketball Coaches (NABC) College All-Star Game representing the West team.

Following his senior season, Harmon was drafted by the Boston Celtics with the 17th pick in the 6th round of the 1974 NBA Draft.

College statistics

Season averages

Season totals

References

External links
Nebraska High School Sports Hall of Fame – nebhalloffame.org
Creighton University Athletics Hall of Fame – gocreighton.com
1970 Nebraska Boys 120-Yard High Hurdles Gold Medalist – nsaahome.org
Creighton legend Gene Harmon more than a big shot – omaha.com
100 years of Creighton basketball – All-Time Teams – omaha.com

1952 births
2015 deaths
American men's basketball players
Boston Celtics draft picks
Creighton Bluejays men's basketball players
Forwards (basketball)